Libyan Sign Language is the deaf sign language of Libya. It appears to belong to the Arab sign language family (Hendriks 2008).

References

Sources
Hendriks, Bernadet, 2008. Jordanian Sign Language: aspects of grammar from a cross-linguistic perspective (dissertation)
Suwed, Abdalla A. 1984. Lughat Al-Ishara Al-`Arabiyah: Laughat As-Sum. Tripoli, Libya: Al-Mansha'ah Al Aamah  Lin-Nasher wal I'lam.

Arab sign languages
Languages of Libya